Dark Oracle is a Canadian teen fantasy television series that premiered in 2004 on YTV. It was created by Jana Sinyor (former writer for Degrassi: The Next Generation and creator of Being Erica), and co-developed by Heather Conkie. In 2005, Dark Oracle won the International Emmy for Best Children's and youth program.

Premise
Dark Oracle follows the adventures of teenage twins Cally and Lance Stone who discover a comic book that gives them clues about the future of their lives. As they are suddenly thrust into a comic book world of danger, fear and uncertainty, the twins learn that Dark Oracle has a hidden agenda that threatens their very existence. In a unique blend of live action and comic book style animation, the two confront their animated alter egos, Violet and Blaze, who possess the uncanny ability to manipulate their future. With events in the comic book world influencing ones in their own world, Cally and Lance struggle to stay one step ahead of their dark counterparts, or face a very unpleasant fate. The stakes become higher still, with Violet and Blaze trying to escape into the real world to wreak further havoc.

Dark Oracle starred Paula Brancati and Alex House as Cally and Lance Stone, along with Jonathan Malen as Dizzy, Lance and Cally's long-time childhood friend and Danielle Miller as Sage, who sparks Lance's interest.

"One of the things that drew us to Dark Oracle, is that it applies a strong high concept, of a comic book coming to life, to the lives of ordinary high school kids. Visually it is going to look amazing, and it is a terrific arena for great dramatic stories as Lance and Cally have to figure out how to deal with the predictions of the comic," explained Suzanne French, producer at Shaftesbury Films.

Dark Oracle's second season took a different turn from the first season, with the comic book characters intervening directly with the main cast. Dizzy and Sage learned about the comic and are going to have their own experiences with it.

Cast and characters

Main

 Cally Stone (Paula Brancati): Twin sister of Lance, pretty and prides herself on being level-headed. She's also the last person who would believe in a comic book that could warp you into new worlds. When she finds herself surrounded by the supernatural, she's faced with believing that anything can happen. In the comic book she is the figure Violet.
 Lance Stone (Alex House): Cally's twin brother, prefers video games and comics to real people. Unlike his sister, he is very shy and tends to keep to himself. When he finds himself drawn into the comic world and meets Sage, this self-proclaimed oddball starts to come out of his shell. In the comic book he is the figure Blaze.
 Dizzy (Jonathan Malen): Lance's best friend, and like Lance he shares a passion for gaming and comics. It's no question that high school poses challenges for Dizzy, especially with his crush on Cally. But with a little time he is able to shake his geek persona and become not-quite-cool... but almost. After a while Lance and Cally decide to tell him about the comic book.
 Sage LaPierre (Danielle Miller): She works at Gamers Cave Comic Book Store and becomes Lance's girlfriend. She doesn't notice the supernatural events around her, although at one point she and Dizzy are told by Lance and Cally all about the comic book. She and Lance break twice over the course of the series due to the comic's influence. Vern has often tried to get her from Lance, but never succeeds.

Supporting

 Doyle (Mark Ellis): He is the owner of Gamers Cave Comic Book Store. He spends a great deal of time in the back of his store, which also doubles as a meeting place for the secretive club of Necromancers. Lance and Cally have a suspicion that he is somehow connected to the strange comic book.
 Annie (Barbara Mamabolo): She is Cally's best friend. She and Cally fight very often since the appearance of the comic. When they fight, Annie hangs out with Kathleen until they make up again. Annie will support Cally in almost everything. She disappears in season 2, never learning about the comic book, and is never mentioned again.
 Omen (Kristopher Turner): He was turned into a frog by Doyle so he could keep his magic under control. In the first episode of the series, Omen sees Lance and overhears his comment on "how you can learn a lot from a comic". Omen then uses the remainder of his magic to transform a previous comic into Dark Oracle. When Lance was invited to Doyle's gaming group, Omen escapes from his cage, hiding in Cally's backpack. Omen is unknowingly taken to the Stone household. Cally names him Nemo, getting the name from the comic. He doesn't regain his human form until Lance gives Nemo a kiss (taken from the story of the frog prince) and Omen's curse is lifted.
 Vern (David Rendall): He is a fellow goth classmate of Lance and Cally. He is neither a friend, nor a true enemy. He always hangs around Simone who might have feelings for him and tries to learn of the powers Omen and Doyle possess. Sometimes he causes trouble for the twins and other times he comes to their aid. Vern saved Lance's life when he was pushed into the mirror by Vern who meant it to be a harmless prank. The outcome was Lance's evil alter-ego taking over Lance's identity, but Vern helped Cally and her friends dispel him from Lance's body.
 Emmett (Nathan Stephenson): He begins to like Cally, but because of the comic, and Omen, their relationship ends.

Episodes

Season 1 (2004–05)

Season 2 (2006)

Production

Home media
Mill Creek Entertainment released the complete series on DVD in Region 1 on August 17, 2010.

Accolades

Notes

References

External links
 Dark Oracle at Cookie Jar Entertainment
, TV.com listing for Dark Oracle
, Dark Oracle clip
 

2000s Canadian children's television series
2004 Canadian television series debuts
2006 Canadian television series endings
Canadian children's fantasy television series
Canadian television series with live action and animation
YTV (Canadian TV channel) original programming
Television shows set in Toronto
Television shows filmed in Toronto
Television shows about comics
Television series about siblings
Television series about teenagers
Television series about twins
Television series by Shaftesbury Films
Television series by Cookie Jar Entertainment
Television series by DHX Media